The 2014 ITF Women's Circuit is the 2014 edition of the second tier tour for women's professional tennis. It is organised by the International Tennis Federation and is a tier below the WTA Tour. The ITF Women's Circuit includes tournaments with prize money ranging from $10,000 up to $100,000.

Key

Month

April

May

June

External links 
 International Tennis Federation (ITF)

 2